Lee Sang-Hun (born October 11, 1975) is a South Korean football player.

He played mostly for FC Seoul, then knowns as Anyang LG Cheethas. He played for the South Korea national football team and was a participant at the 1998 FIFA World Cup.

Club career statistics

External links
 
 National Team Player Record 
 
 

1975 births
Living people
Association football defenders
South Korean footballers
South Korea international footballers
FC Seoul players
Incheon United FC players
K League 1 players
1998 FIFA World Cup players
Footballers at the 1996 Summer Olympics
Olympic footballers of South Korea
Sportspeople from Incheon